The 2012–13 Utah Utes men's basketball team represented the University of Utah during the 2012–13 NCAA Division I men's basketball season. They play their home games at the Jon M. Huntsman Center in Salt Lake City, Utah, and were a member of the Pac-12 Conference. They were led by their second year head coach Larry Krystkowiak. They finished the season 15–18, 5–13 in Pac-12 play to finish in tenth place. They advanced to the semifinals of the Pac-12 tournament where they lost to Oregon.

Roster

Schedule and results 
All home games and conference road games will be broadcast on television on FSN, ESPN Networks, or Pac-12 Rocky Mountain with a tape delay and sometimes live broadcast on the national Pac-12 Network. All games will be broadcast on the radio and streamed online by KALL 700 Sports, home of the Utah Utes, unless the November 23 game interferes with the football broadcast. That game could be broadcast on KUDE Rock 99.1.

|-
!colspan=9 | Exhibition

|-
!colspan=9 | Regular season

|-
!colspan=9| 2013 Pac-12 Conference men's basketball tournament

References 

Utah
Utah Utes men's basketball seasons
Utah Utes
Utah Utes